Jean Porthaise (1520–1602) was a French theologian.

1520 births
1602 deaths
French Franciscans
16th-century French Catholic theologians